Hawthorne is a city in the Los Angeles metropolitan area, located in southwestern Los Angeles County, California. It is part of a seventeen-city region commonly called the South Bay. As of the 2020 US census, Hawthorne had a population of 88,083.

History

Hawthorne was founded in 1905 as the "Hawthorne Improvement Company" by B.L. Harding and H.D. Lombard. Harding's daughter shared her birthday—the 4th of July, American Independence Day—with New England author Nathaniel Hawthorne, and a decision was made to name the city after him.

Hawthorne was once a "whites only" settlement, commonly called a sundown town.  During the 1930s, signs warned African-Americans to be out of Hawthorne by sundown.

Geography

To the north of Hawthorne is the unincorporated community of Lennox and the city of Inglewood. To the east is the unincorporated community of Athens and the city of Gardena. To the south is the unincorporated community of El Camino Village, and the cities of Lawndale and Redondo Beach. Manhattan Beach is at the southwest corner of Hawthorne. To the west is the city of El Segundo, and the Los Angeles neighborhood of Westchester is to the northwest of Hawthorne. The unincorporated community of Del Aire is surrounded on three sides by Hawthorne.

The Century Freeway (Glenn Anderson Freeway, I-105) runs along the northern boundary of Hawthorne, with the LACMTA Green Line light rail line running down the center of the Century Freeway. The San Diego Freeway (I-405) runs along the western boundary of Hawthorne. Major east–west streets in Hawthorne include Rosecrans Avenue, El Segundo Boulevard, and Imperial Highway. Major north–south streets include Aviation Boulevard, Inglewood Avenue, Hawthorne Boulevard, Prairie Avenue, Crenshaw Boulevard, and Van Ness Avenue.

Hawthorne is five miles (8 km) from the Los Angeles International Airport.

Hawthorne comprises ZIP codes 90250 and 90251. It is in the 310 area code, except for a small portion of northeastern Hawthorne, which is located in the 323 area code.

Climate

Hawthorne, like the rest of the Los Angeles basin, has a Mediterranean climate:

 On average, the warmest month is August.
 On average, the coolest month is January.
 Most rainfall occurs during winter and spring.

Hawthorne has a Mediterranean climate or dry-summer subtropical (Köppen climate classification Csb on the coast, Csa inland), enjoying plenty of sunshine throughout the year, with an average of 263 sunshine days and only 35 days with measurable precipitation annually.

Due to the moderating effect of the ocean, temperatures are cooler than more inland areas of Los Angeles, where temperatures frequently exceed 90 °F (32 °C) and occasionally reach 100 °F (38 °C).

The Los Angeles area is also subject to the phenomena typical of a microclimate. As such, the temperatures can vary as much as 18 °F (10 °C) between inland areas and the coast, with a temperature gradient of over one degree per mile (1.6 km) from the coast inland. California has also a weather phenomenon called "June Gloom or May Grey", which sometimes brings overcast or foggy skies in the morning at the coast, but usually gives way to sunny skies by noon, during late spring and early summer.

The Los Angeles region averages 15 inches (385 mm) of precipitation annually, which mainly occurs during the winter and spring (November through April) with generally light rain showers, but sometimes as heavy rainfall and thunderstorms. On November 6, 1966, the first-ever documented tornado touched down within city limits. Snowfall is extremely rare but not impossible in the city basin.

Demographics

2010
At the 2010 census Hawthorne had a population of 84,293. The racial makeup of Hawthorne was 27,678 (32.8%) White (10.3% Non-Hispanic White), 23,385 (27.7%) African American, 565 (0.7%) Native American, 5,642 (6.7%) Asian, 974 (1.2%) Pacific Islander, 22,127 (26.3%) from other races, and 3,922 (4.7%) from two or more races. Hispanic or Latino of any race were 44,572 persons (52.9%).

The census reported that 83,754 people (99.4% of the population) lived in households, 208 (0.2%) lived in non-institutionalized group quarters, and 331 (0.4%) were institutionalized.

There were 28,486 households, 12,330 (43.3%) had children under the age of 18 living in them, 10,833 (38.0%) were opposite-sex married couples living together, 6,369 (22.4%) had a female householder with no husband present, 2,357 (8.3%) had a male householder with no wife present.  There were 2,309 (8.1%) unmarried opposite-sex partnerships, and 191 (0.7%) same-sex married couples or partnerships. Of the households, 7,125 (25.0%) were one person and 1,430 (5.0%) had someone living alone who was 65 or older. The average household size was 2.94.  There were 19,559 families (68.7% of households); the average family size was 3.54.

The age distribution was 23,157 people (27.5%) under the age of 18, 9,487 people (11.3%) aged 18 to 24, 27,035 people (32.1%) aged 25 to 44, 18,395 people (21.8%) aged 45 to 64, and 6,219 people (7.4%) who were 65 or older.  The median age was 31.5 years. For every 100 females, there were 93.2 males.  For every 100 females age 18 and over, there were 89.6 males.

There were 29,869 housing units at an average density of 4,902.7 per square mile, of the occupied units 7,623 (26.8%) were owner-occupied and 20,863 (73.2%) were rented. The homeowner vacancy rate was 1.5%; the rental vacancy rate was 4.6%.  25,869 people (30.7% of the population) lived in owner-occupied housing units and 57,885 people (68.7%) lived in rental housing units.

During 2009–2013, Hawthorne had a median household income of $44,649, with 19.2% of the population living below the federal poverty line.

2000
As of the census of 2000, there were 84,112 people in 28,536 households, including 19,775 families, in the city. The population density was 13,879.4 inhabitants per square mile (5,359.0/km). The racial makeup of the city was 29.27% White, 39.02% Black or African American, 0.75% Native American, 7.73% Asian, 0.86% Pacific Islander, 24.16% from other races, and 5.22% from two or more races.  44.3% of the population were Hispanic or Latino of any race.

There were 28,536 households, 43.7% included children under the age of 18, 38.6% were married couples living together, 23.5% had a female householder with no husband present, and 30.7% were non-families. Of all households 24.5% were one person and 4.5% were one person aged 65 or older.  The average household size was 2.93 and the average family size was 3.50.

The age distribution was 31.7% under the age of 18, 11.3% from 18 to 24, 34.9% from 25 to 44, 16.1% from 45 to 64, and 6.1% 65 or older.  The median age was 29 years. For every 100 females, there were 92.6 males.  For every 100 females age 18 and over, there were 87.3 males.

The median household income was $31,887 and the median family income  was $35,149. Males had a median income of $29,481 versus $27,427 for females. The per capita income for the city was $15,022.  About 18.4% of families and 20.3% of the population were below the poverty line, including 25.6% of those under age 18 and 9.0% of those age 65 or over.

Mexican (27.1%) and Filipino (2.6%) are the most common ancestries in the city. Mexico (45.1%) and Guatemala (9.3%) are the most common foreign places of birth in the city.

Economy

As of 2022 the city is known as a center for the space industry and hosts numerous space related private companies, industries and startups. The relatively large number of aerospace engineers and technicians, history of established aerospace companies, and the presence of SpaceX has facilitated the development of space engineering industry cluster in the city.  According to the City's 2021 Comprehensive Annual Financial Report, the top employers in the city are:

Besides the current top employers, the following businesses are currently located in Hawthorne:

 Century Media Records, independent rock label.
 Tesla, Inc. has its design center at the Hawthorne Municipal Airport. 
 Konami Digital Entertainment has its US offices in Hawthorne.
 Arch Motorcycle is headquartered in Hawthorne.
 Mynaric has an office and laboratory in Hawthorne.

Previously in Hawthorne:

 Mattel (formerly), toy manufacturer; originally started in Hawthorne in 1945 and moved to their current facility in nearby El Segundo, California by 1991.
 Hawthorne Plaza, a regional shopping center, now closed
 The Boring Company, infrastructure and tunnel construction services company.
 Northrop Corporation, founded in 1939 and headquartered in Hawthorne, became a major manufacturer of aircraft during World War II, as well as a major subcontractor to other aircraft companies. Jack Northrop developed his famous flying wings, which ultimately led to the B-2 stealth bomber.  Northrop also produced the P-61 Black Widow fighter in its Hawthorne plant, which was on the south side of Northrop Field (present-day Hawthorne Airport).  The facility was, for some time, used as an aircraft plant, producing fuselage sections for Boeing 747s and 787s.  The building is currently used as the headquarters and main factory of SpaceX.

Government

Municipal government
Hawthorne has an elected city council composed of a mayor elected every four years and four city council members elected on four year terms.

According to the city's most recent "Comprehensive Annual Financial Report," its various funds had $126.1 million in revenues, $113.2 million in expenditures, $220.2 million in total assets, $152.7 million in total liabilities, and $29.6 million in cash and investments.
The structure of the management and coordination of city services is:  The city manager is Vontray Norris.

State and federal representation

Education

Primary and secondary schools
Hawthorne is served by multiple school districts.
Centinela Valley Union High School District
Hawthorne High School
Leuzinger High School (Lawndale, California)
Lawndale High School (Lawndale, California)
Hawthorne School District
Wiseburn School District
 Juan Cabrillo Elementary School (Kindergarten-2nd grade)
 138th St School (3rd-5th grade) (To Be Renamed)
 Richard Henry Dana Middle School (6th-8th grade)
 Da Vinci Schools (9th-12th grade)
Lawndale Elementary School District
 Franklin D. Roosevelt-Kit Carson Elementary School (Alondra Park)
 Will Rogers Middle School (Lawndale)
Lennox School District
 Elementary schools with boundaries coinciding include: Buford, Jefferson, and Moffett
 All district residents are zoned to Lennox Middle School (grades 7–8)
Los Angeles Unified School District
 Cimarron Elementary School (Hawthorne)
 Clay Middle School (Unincorporated area)
 Washington Preparatory High School (Unincorporated area)

In addition Los Angeles County Office of Education operates Southwest Day (5th-12th grade).

Hawthorne Math and Science Academy is a charter high school in Hawthorne associated with the Hawthorne School District.

Private schools

Saint Joseph's Parish School (Catholic)
Trinity Lutheran School
Al Huda Islamic School

Colleges and universities

Los Angeles Community College District
Los Angeles Southwest College (in an unincorporated area in Los Angeles County)
El Camino College

Media
The Hawthorne Press Tribune is the community newspaper for the City of Hawthorne.

Infrastructure
The Los Angeles County Department of Health Services operates the Curtis Tucker Health Center in Inglewood, serving Hawthorne.

The United States Postal Service Hawthorne Post Office is located at 12700 Inglewood Avenue.

Notable people

 All of the original members of the Beach Boys grew up in Hawthorne—Brian, Dennis and Carl Wilson, Mike Love, and Al Jardine—as did early member David Marks. The Wilsons' childhood home is commemorated by the Beach Boys Historic Landmark.
 Carl Boenish, base jumper
 NFL players Curtis Conway, Jason Simmons, and Dennis Northcutt have all resided in Hawthorne.
 Fred Dryer, defensive end in the NFL, actor and producer, was born in Hawthorne in 1946
 Domo Genesis of OFWGKTA was born in Hawthorne.
Singer-songwriter Cuco grew up and currently resides in Hawthorne.
 NEA chairman Dana Gioia was born and reared in Hawthorne.
 Jazz critic and music historian Ted Gioia was born and raised in Hawthorne and graduated from Hawthorne High.
 Tracy Jones, former Major League Baseball player and 700 WLW radio host, was born in Hawthorne.
 Rapper Kurupt lived in Hawthorne after moving from Philadelphia.
 Scott Laidlaw, running back for the Dallas Cowboys and the New York Giants of the NFL, was born in Hawthorne, grew up in Hawthorne, and went to Hawthorne High School.
 Michael Marsh, Olympic gold medalist, attended Hawthorne High
 Mike McDermott, former member of the Maryland House of Delegates, was born in Hawthorne.
 Actress Marilyn Monroe lived in the city from infancy until she was 6.
 Singer Chris Montez grew up in Hawthorne.
 Jack Northrop founded and managed Northrop Corporation, which was headquartered in Hawthorne (see Economy section above).
 Actor Butch Patrick of TV's The Munsters lived in Hawthorne for a short time.
 Red Cloud, American rapper of indigenous Mexican descent, was born in Hawthorne.
 Musician Emitt Rhodes lived in Hawthorne.
 Major League Baseball pitcher (New York Mets and Houston Astros) and Cy Young Award winner Mike Scott grew up in Hawthorne and graduated from Hawthorne High School in 1973.
 Film and stage actress Betta St. John was born in Hawthorne.
 Sports figure Jim Thorpe resided in Hawthorne during part of his life, and there is a park named after him.
 Tyler, the Creator of OFWGKTA grew up in Hawthorne. The name of the city is seen on the cover of his album Call Me If You Get Lost.
 Russell Westbrook of the Los Angeles Clippers grew up in Hawthorne.
 Dorell Wright of the Portland Trail Blazers grew up in Hawthorne.
 Gyasi Zardes of the Columbus Crew SC grew up in Hawthorne.

References

Further reading
 Dixon, Walt, and Jerry Roberts (2005). Hawthorne. Images of America. Charleston, SC: Arcadia Publishing. . .

External links

 

 
1922 establishments in California
Cities in Los Angeles County, California
Incorporated cities and towns in California
Populated places established in 1922
South Bay, Los Angeles
Sundown towns in California